Francis Stafford Pipe-Wolferstan (14 October 1826 – 3 November 1900) was an English cricketer. Pipe-Wolferstan's batting style is unknown.

Born at Statfold, Staffordshire, Pipe-Wolferstan was educated at Eton College before studying law at Balliol College, Oxford. While studying at the university he made a single appearance in first-class cricket for Oxford University against the Marylebone Cricket Club in 1846 at Lord's. In a match which Oxford University won by an innings and 17 runs, he scored 7 runs in his only innings, before being dismissed by William Lillywhite.

He was a member of the Inner Temple and was a barrister until 1871. Between 1871 and 1891 he was a farmer of 796 acres and employed seventeen people. He was resident at Statfold Hall in his home village and died there on 3 November 1900.

References

External links
Francis Pipe-Wolferstan at ESPNcricinfo
Francis Pipe-Wolferstan at CricketArchive

1826 births
1900 deaths
People from Statfold
People educated at Eton College
Alumni of Balliol College, Oxford
English cricketers
Oxford University cricketers
Members of the Inner Temple
English barristers
19th-century King's Counsel
19th-century English farmers
19th-century English lawyers